William McCoy (September 20, 1768August 19, 1835) was an 18th- and 19th-century politician from Virginia.

Early life
William McCoy was born near Warrenton in Fauquier County in the Colony of Virginia.

Career
McCoy was a member of the Virginia House of Delegates from 1798 to 1804.

He was elected a Democratic-Republican, Crawford Republican and Jacksonian to the United States House of Representatives in 1810, serving from 1811 to 1833. There, he served as chairman of the Committee on Claims from 1827 to 1829.

McCoy was a delegate to the Virginia Constitutional Convention of 1829-1830, serving from a state senatorial district that included Augusta, Rockbridge and Pendleton Counties. There he served on the Committee of the Executive Department.

Death
William McCoy died in Charlottesville, Virginia, in 1835 and was interred in the University of Virginia Cemetery.

Electoral history

1811; McCoy was elected to the U.S. House of Representatives with 52.64% of the vote, defeating Federalist Samuel Blackburn.
1813; McCoy was re-elected unopposed.
1815; McCoy was re-elected with 51.01% of the vote, defeating Federalist Robert Porterfield.
1817; McCoy was re-elected unopposed.
1819; McCoy was re-elected unopposed.
1821; McCoy was re-elected unopposed.

References

Bibliography

External links

Virginia State Elections Database Project Electoral History and Biography

1768 births
1835 deaths
People from Warrenton, Virginia
Members of the Virginia House of Delegates
Democratic-Republican Party members of the United States House of Representatives from Virginia
Jacksonian members of the United States House of Representatives from Virginia
19th-century American politicians
Burials at the University of Virginia Cemetery
Deans of the United States House of Representatives